Cove is an unincorporated community in southeast McDonald County, in the U.S. state of Missouri. Cove is on Missouri Route 90 and Trent Creek flows past the community to the south.

History
Cove originally served as a country office. A post office called Cove was established in 1894, and remained in operation until 1907.

References

Unincorporated communities in McDonald County, Missouri
Unincorporated communities in Missouri